Kai Pröger (born 15 May 1992) is a German professional footballer who plays as a right winger for 2. Bundesliga club Hansa Rostock.

Career
Pröger made his professional debut for Mainz 05 II in the 3. Liga on 2 August 2014, coming on as a substitute in the 63rd minute for Marc Wachs in the 2–2 away draw against Fortuna Köln.

In January 2019, Präger joined 2. Bundesliga side SC Paderborn 07 from fourth-tier Rot-Weiss Essen on a 2.5-year contract until 2021.

After an extension until 2022, Pröger signed with Hansa Rostock in May 2022.

References

External links
 
 
 VfB Oldenburg II statistics at Fussball.de
 

1992 births
Living people
People from Wilhelmshaven
Footballers from Lower Saxony
German footballers
Association football midfielders
VfB Oldenburg players
1. FSV Mainz 05 II players
Berliner FC Dynamo players
Rot-Weiss Essen players
SC Paderborn 07 players
FC Hansa Rostock players
Bundesliga players
2. Bundesliga players
3. Liga players
Regionalliga players